Navlinsky District is an administrative and municipal district (raion), one of the twenty-seven in Bryansk Oblast, Russia. It is located in the east of the oblast. Its administrative center is the urban locality (a work settlement) of Navlya. Population:   29,783 (2002 Census);  The population of Navlya accounts for 57.7% of the district's total population.

References

Sources

Districts of Bryansk Oblast